Robert George Pickett (February 11, 1938 – April 25, 2007), known also by the name Bobby "Boris" Pickett, was an American singer, songwriter, actor, and comedian known for co-writing and performing the 1962 hit novelty song "Monster Mash". Born in Somerville, Massachusetts, Pickett watched many horror films as a result of his father's position as a local movie theater manager. He started improvising impressions of Hollywood film stars at a young age. At a turning point in his career, Pickett was a vocalist for local swing band Darren Bailes and the Wolf Eaters. He would later serve from 1956–1959 in the United States Army, stationed in Korea for a period of time.

He co-wrote his signature song, "Monster Mash", with Leonard Capizzi in May 1962 as a spoof of popular contemporary dance crazes. Pickett's performances include impersonations of Boris Karloff (The Mummy (1932)) and Bela Lugosi (Dracula (1931)), and although major labels declined to distribute the song, Gary S. Paxton finally agreed to release it across the United States. "Monster Mash" became a million seller and peaked at number 1 on the Billboard Hot 100 for two weeks in October 1962, including Halloween. The song has since re-charted three more times -- in 1970, 1973 (when it reached the Top Ten) and 2021.

Though Pickett never achieved the same success as he did with "Monster Mash" on the charts, he continued to lend his voice to further parodies and other songs throughout the rest of his life. Pickett also made appearances as on television, film, and radio as a guest star, narrator, actor, and disc jockey. He released Monster Mash: Half Dead in Hollywood, an autobiography, in 2005. Pickett died of leukemia on April 25, 2007, at age 69.

Early life
Pickett was born in Somerville, Massachusetts, on February 11, 1938. His family lived in the Winter Hill neighborhood and he attended Somerville High School. His father was a theater manager and as a nine-year-old, he watched many horror films. He would later incorporate impressions of them in his Hollywood nightclub act in 1959. An aspiring actor, Pickett began his musical career as a vocalist for a local swing band, Darren Bailes and the Wolf Eaters. Pickett served in the United States Army from March 9, 1956, to March 13, 1959, and was stationed in Korea for an unknown period of time.

Career
Pickett co-wrote "Monster Mash" with Leonard Capizzi in May 1962. The song was a spoof on the dance crazes popular at the time, including the Twist and the Mashed Potato, which inspired the title. The song featured Pickett's impersonations of veteran horror stars Boris Karloff and Bela Lugosi (the latter with the line "Whatever happened to my Transylvania Twist?"). Every major record label declined the song but after hearing it, Gary S. Paxton agreed to produce and engineer it. Among the musicians who played on it were pianist Leon Russell and The Ventures drummer Mel Taylor. Issued on Paxton's Garpax Records, the single became a million seller, reaching number 1 on the Billboard Hot 100 chart for two weeks before Halloween in 1962. It was styled as being by "Bobby (Boris) Pickett and the Crypt-Kickers". The track re-entered the U.S. charts twice, in August 1970, and again in May 1973, when it reached the #10 spot. In Britain it took until October 1973 for the tune to become popular, peaking at number 3 in the UK Singles Chart. For the second time, the record sold over one million copies. The tune remains a Halloween perennial on radio and on iTunes. A Christmas-themed follow-up, "Monster's Holiday", (with "Monster Motion" on the B side) was also released in 1962 and reached number 30 in December that year. "Blood Bank Blues" (with "Me and My Mummy" on the B side) did not chart. This was followed by further monster-themed recordings such as the album The Original Monster Mash and such singles as "Werewolf Watusi" and "The Monster Swim", the latter of which made it to No. 135 on the Bubbling Under chart and was credited under "Bobby Pickett and The Rolling Bones". In 1973, Pickett rerecorded "Me and My Mummy" for a Metromedia 45 (it did not chart). Another of Pickett's songs, "Graduation Day", made number 80 in June 1963. Then in 1985, with American culture experiencing a growing awareness of rap music, Pickett released "Monster Rap", which describes the mad scientist's frustration at being unable to teach the dancing monster from "Monster Mash" how to talk. The problem is solved when he teaches the monster to rap.

Further parodies
In 1975, Pickett recorded a novelty spoof on Star Trek called "Star Drek" with Peter Ferrara, again performing some of the various voices, which was played on Dr. Demento's radio show for many years. He also performed a duet with Ferrara in 1976 titled "King Kong (Your Song)" spoofing the movie by the same name that was released that year.

In the early 1980s a musical "sequel" to "Monster Mash" called "Monster Rap" was released, which featured Pickett teaching the creature to speak in rap.

In 1993, Pickett wrote and performed "It's Alive", another sequel of sorts to the original "Mash" song. It did not chart but was played occasionally on the Demento show.

In 2004 and 2005, Pickett provided vocals for two Flash cartoons, "Monster Slash" and "Climate Mash", featuring new versions of his hit single. The cartoons protested inaction on the United States government's part towards deforestation and global warming.

Record label venture
In 1962, it was reported in the December 1 issue of Cashbox that Pickett along with Ned Ormand and R.B. Chris Christensen had formed Nico Records. Christensen had been a partner and professional manager in Buck Owens' Bluebook Music Publishing co. They had acquired an instrumental from the Daco label which was to be their first release. The instrumental was by The Revels of "Church Key" and "Six Pak" fame.

Film and writing
In 1967, Pickett and television author Sheldon Allman wrote the musical I'm Sorry the Bridge Is Out, You'll Have to Spend the Night. It has been produced by local theaters around the United States. They followed it with another musical, Frankenstein Unbound. In 1995, the co-writers of Pixar's Toy Story, Joel Cohen and Alec Sokolow, produced a movie of it, originally titled Frankenstein Sings, but later released in the United States as Monster Mash: The Movie. Pickett starred in it with Candace Cameron, Jimmie Walker, Mink Stole, John Kassir, Sarah Douglas, Anthony Crivello, Adam Shankman and Carrie Ann Inaba. On ABC-TV, he appeared on a segment of The Long Hot Summer, with Roy Thinnes and Nancy Malone, on January 26, 1966.

In 1962 or 1963, Pickett also hosted a weekly disc jockey show on KRLA in Los Angeles.

In 1965, he appeared in several episodes of the sitcom Petticoat Junction as either Walter Thorp or Stonewall Jackson.

Pickett appeared in films in several classic genres: beach movie, It's a Bikini World (1967); biker, Chrome and Hot Leather (1971); horror, Deathmaster (1972) and the sci-fi comedy film, Lobster Man from Mars (1989).

Pickett appeared in such roles as Archie Bunker as part of a stage comedy revue about television, presented in Boston, titled Don't Touch That Dial.

In 1991, he appeared as a guest on the television show Beyond Vaudeville.

In 2004, Pickett served as the narrator of the children's film Spookley the Square Pumpkin.

In 2005, Pickett published his autobiography through Trafford Publishing, titled Monster Mash: Half Dead in Hollywood.

For many years, Pickett performed for "The Lost 45s with Barry Scott" Halloween show in the Boston area.

Death
On April 25, 2007, Pickett died in Los Angeles, California, from leukemia at age 69. The May 13, 2007, episode of the Dr. Demento show featured a documentary retrospective of Pickett's work.

References

External links

 Official site
 Official MySpace site
 
 
 Biographical obituary discussing in-depth the life, career and importance of Pickett and his hit song from NewYorkNightTrain.com
 
 Classicbands.com entry on Bobby "Boris" Pickett
 
 Interview with Bobby Pickett, June 18, 2003; author: Linda Alexander

1938 births
2007 deaths
Singers from Massachusetts
RCA Victor artists
Musicians from Somerville, Massachusetts
United States Army soldiers
Deaths from leukemia
Deaths from cancer in California
20th-century American singers
20th-century American male singers